Giorgi Targamadze (born November 22, 1973 in Tbilisi) is a journalist and politician.  He was the Leader of the Christian-Democratic Movement of Georgia from 2008 to 2014, which was the largest opposition party in parliament, second to the governing party, the United National Movement from 2008 to 2012. As such, he was Leader of the Parliamentary Minority.

In  2003–2008, he was a Public – Political Director of TV company "Imedi",  and author and leader of analytic program "Droeba". In 1999–2003, he was a member of Georgian Parliament and the head of  Faction "United Georgia".

Career 
Giorgi Targamadze was born on November 22, 1973. The day before St. George's Day. Because of it, his parents – Zhana Vacheishvili and Robert Targamadze decided to name newborn son – Giorgi. He received secondary education at public school N18, where he studied for eight grades. Then he continued his studies at Nikophore Irbakhi's Polygraph School.

In 1991–1999 he studied at Tbilisi State University, Faculty of Journalism.  Before the start of the study, he was leading the youth program "vision", which influenced his professional choice.

Along with the acquisition of theoretical knowledge, he was leading the news program "Monitor" and analytical program "Digest- Monitor" at TV Company "Ibervizia" in 1991–1993;
1993-1995 – Head of TV- Radio Department of Adjara;
1995-1997 – Head of TV Company "Batumi";
1997-1999 – Press-Secretary of  Supreme Council's Chairman of Autonomous Republic of Adjara;

Politics 
Due to country's political and social situation, at the age of 26, Giorgi Targamadze decided to actively involve in political processes. In 1999, he became the member of Parliament and the head of Faction "United Georgia." In 2002 he made the personal statement, left the Parliament and started working at the TV Company "Imedi".

In 2003 he returned to his journalistic activities. For 4 years he was working as a director of public-political programs at "Imedi." Simultaneously, he was the author and the leader of rating telecast "Droeba".

After the events of November 2007, Giorgi Targamadze and his friends left the journalism field and on St. David's Day, February 8, 2008 he founded a political party – Christian-Democratic Movement.

Headed by Giorgi Targamadze "Christian-Democratic Movement" took part in parliamentary elections in the May 2008. The party achieved success and political faction "Christian-Democrats" was established in legislative body.

In local elections of 2010 party has shown improved results and has taken the second place on country's scale. Nowadays, the "Christian – Democratic Movement" has its representatives in Georgian Parliament, as well as in all municipal councils in regions and towns.

Bidzina Ivanishvili, oligarch and leader of the Georgian Dream movement, stated publicly that he would not work with Targamadze's because of his "numerous suspicious moments".

Teaching activities 
In 1994–1999 he was delivering the lectures on fundamental principles of journalism at Adjara State University of Fine Arts. Since 2002, he has conducted the same course for the Tbilisi State University of Theatre and Film.

Academic degree 
In May 2011, Giorgi Targamadze was awarded Academic Degree of Doctor for social sciences. The dissertation is titled "Modern TV News – Journalism and Civil society". He defended it at Georgian Technical University.

Family 
Giorgi Targamadze is married to Tatia Topuria, who is an art critic by profession. They have two children- Tekla and Makine Targamadze.

References

External links
Biography of Giorgi Targamadze on 'Christian – Democratic Movement's  official web page
Official page on Facebook
Channel on YouTube
Meeting of US – Ambassador and the Leader of "Christian – Democratic Movement"
Giorgi targamadze – Guest of "Hardtalk"       	
Giorgi Targamadze – Guest of "American Voice"

Politicians from Tbilisi
Christian-Democratic Movement (Georgia) politicians
Members of the Parliament of Georgia
Tbilisi State University alumni
1973 births
Living people